Lygra was a RoRo vessel launched on 3 October 1978 at Glommen Mekaniske Verksteder AS, Norway. She was broken up for scrap at Alang on 25 February 2018.

References

Ships of Seatruck Ferries
1978 ships
Ferries of Norway
Merchant ships of Saint Kitts and Nevis
Ships built in Fredrikstad